This is a list of musicians and musical groups from Egypt.

Abou El Leef
Amal Maher
Amira Selim
Amr Diab
Angham
Anoushka
Carmen Suleiman
Dina El Wedidi
Hisham Abbas
Leila Mourad
Mayam Mahmoud
Mohamed Mounir
Mohammed Abdel Wahab
Tamer Hosny
Ezz Eddin Hosni (1927-2013)
Mounira El Mahdeya
Nesma Mahgoub
Ratiba El-Hefny
Ruby
Sayed Darwish
Shadiya
Sherine
Wegz (trap singer)
Umm Kulthum
Yasmine Niazy
Yousra
Zizi Adel

 
Musicians
Egypt